Patrode/Patrodo/Patra/Patrodu originally a vegetarian dish from India. It is also adapted in the Himachal Pradesh region, UP & Bihar as "Rikvach" and some other names in other parts of India. Patra in Sanskrit & its derivative languages means leaf & vade/vado means dumpling. It is also known as Rikvach in UP and Bihar and Saina in Fiji and Saheena in Trinidad and Tobago.

It is made from colocasia leaves (chevu in Tulu, taro, kesuve or arbi) stuffed with gram or rice flour and flavourings such as spices, tamarind, and jaggery (raw sugar).

In July 2021, it has been identified as one of the traditional food recipes from the AYUSH system of medicine by the Union Ministry of AYUSH. according ministry of AYUSH, Iron-rich colocasia leaves help in improving the hemoglobin level. The leaves contain phenols, tannins, flavonoids, glycosides and sterols, which help in reducing chronic inflammation such as rheumatoid arthritis. The leaves have significant amounts of vitamin C and beta carotene. 

Care must be taken during preparation that the leaves are adequately cooked. Colocasia esculenta is a member of the Araceae group of plants (including caladium, philodendron, anthurium, alocasia, peace lily, etc.), which are all known to contain irritating calcium oxalate crystals. Only through proper duration of steaming/cooking are they palatable. Mild side  effects are described as feeling similar to “swallowing sand” or having “a mouthful of glass”, sensations which can be accompanied by nausea, side aches and potential kidney stone formation, in the worst-case scenarios. Many other plants with thick, glossy foliage contain these same oxalate crystals as a natural defense against animals, albeit in varying concentrations, such as Swiss chard, and there are no issues for the consumer. The vast majority of people do not suffer from any issues, as most chefs prepare the taro leaves correctly.

See also
 List of steamed foods

References

Maharashtrian cuisine
Konkani cuisine
Fijian cuisine
Rice dishes
Indian snack foods
Deep fried foods
Steamed foods